Benni Miller (born Bennie Roy Miller; December 31, 1984), better known by the stage name Ra'Jah O'Hara, is an American drag queen best known for competing on the eleventh season of RuPaul's Drag Race in 2019 and the sixth season of RuPaul's Drag Race All Stars in 2021 finishing as a runner-up. She was crowned the winner of the international All Stars spin-off series, Canada's Drag Race: Canada vs. the World which aired in 2022.

Career 
Ra'Jah O'Hara was announced to be one of fifteen contestants competing on the eleventh season of RuPaul's Drag Race on January 24, 2019. In the third episode, she was involved in the show's first ever six-way lip sync with Honey Davenport, A'keria C. Davenport, Plastique Tiara, Scarlet Envy, and Shuga Cain, which she survived. She later lip-synced again against Scarlet Envy, sending her home to Donna Summer's "Last Dance". The following episode, she lip synced again with A'keria C. Davenport to Sheena Easton's "Strut", where she was sent home. Ra'Jah O'Hara competed in pageants prior to Drag Race. She originally was billed as Ra'jah O'Hara Narcisse. Her drag mothers are pageant titleholders Sha'Niah Ellis Narcisse, Silkie O'Hara Munro, and Kelexis Davenport.

In June 2021, Ra'Jah O'Hara was announced as one of the thirteen contestants competing on the sixth season of RuPaul's Drag Race All Stars. In the second episode of the series, she was declared the winner of the main challenge. She lip-synced to Janet Jackson's "Miss You Much" against Season 11 runner-up and co-host of Canada's Drag Race, Brooke Lynn Hytes. They were both declared winners. Ra'Jah O'Hara sent home fellow contestant Jiggly Caliente in addition to winning $20,000. She also won the main challenge in the ninth episode, but lost the lip sync to Charli XCX's "Boom Clap" against Kameron Michaels. She finished the season as a runner-up with two wins and two bottoms in the sixth and the eleventh episode.

In October 2022, Ra'Jah O'Hara was announced to compete in the international All Stars season based in Canada, Canada's Drag Race: Canada vs. the World. In the second episode, the Snatch Game, she placed in the Top 2 with the winner of the second season of Canada's Drag Race, Icesis Couture, in which she lost the Lip sync to "Sk8er Boi" by Avril Lavigne against her. On December 23, 2022, Ra'Jah O'Hara was declared the winner of the season, beating fellow Season 11 contestant Silky Nutmeg Ganache in a Lip Sync for the Crown to "River Deep – Mountain High" by Celine Dion. She won $100,000 as well as the title of "Queen of the Mother-Pucking World", previously held by RuPaul's Drag Race UK alumnus and winner of RuPaul's Drag Race: UK vs the World, Blu Hydrangea.

Education
Miller attended the Booker T. Washington High School for the Performing and Visual Arts.

Personal life
Miller was born to Telesia Ann Miller and lives in Dallas, Texas. Miller is a member of the Drag Haus of Davenport, with Drag Race alum Kennedy Davenport, Sahara Davenport, Monet X Change, Honey Davenport and A'keria C. Davenport.

Filmography

Television

Theatre

Web series

Music videos

Discography

As featured artist

Awards and nominations

References

1985 births
Living people
African-American drag queens
People from Dallas
RuPaul's Drag Race All Stars contestants
Ra'Jah O'Hara
Drag Race (franchise) winners